Longueau is a commune in the Somme department in Hauts-de-France in northern France.

Geography
Longueau station has rail connections to Amiens, Creil, Arras, Lille, Compiègne and Paris.

Population

Places of interest
The town was once a railway centre. The reinforced concrete depot, now a registered historic monument is one of four designed by Bernard Lafaille between the two world wars.

See also
Communes of the Somme department

References

Communes of Somme (department)